Moossou F.C. is an Ivorian football club, which is based in Bassam. The club plays in the Ligue 1.

Honours
Côte d'Ivoire Premier Division: 0

Côte d'Ivoire Cup: 0

Coupe de la Ligue de Côte d'Ivoire: 1
 2016.

Félix Houphouët-Boigny Cup: 0

References

Football clubs in Ivory Coast
Sport in Comoé District
Sud-Comoé